Efrem Morelli (born 25 November 1979) is an Italian Paralympic swimmer. He represented Italy at the Summer Paralympics in 2008, 2012, 2016 and 2021 and he won the bronze medal in the 50 m breaststroke SB3 event in 2016.

At the 2019 World Para Swimming Championships held in London, United Kingdom, he set a new record in the men's 50 metre breaststroke SB3 event with a time of 47.49s.

References

External links 
 

1979 births
Living people
Italian male breaststroke swimmers
Paralympic swimmers of Italy
Paralympic bronze medalists for Italy
Paralympic medalists in swimming
Swimmers at the 2008 Summer Paralympics
Swimmers at the 2012 Summer Paralympics
Swimmers at the 2016 Summer Paralympics
Swimmers at the 2020 Summer Paralympics
Medalists at the 2016 Summer Paralympics
Medalists at the World Para Swimming Championships
Medalists at the World Para Swimming European Championships
Place of birth missing (living people)
S4-classified Paralympic swimmers
21st-century Italian people